North Imphal Sporting Association, commonly known as NISA Manipur, is an Indian professional football club based in Thangmeiband, Manipur. NISA is five-time champions of the Manipur State League, which is a project under the Vision Asia program by the Asian Football Confederation (AFC). They have also participated in the I-League 2nd Division, then second tier of Indian football league system.

History

Formation and journey
North Imphal Sporting Association was originally founded during the 1950s and was revived in 2006. The club is affiliated with the All Manipur Football Association (AMFA). NISA has been participating in the prestigious Manipur State Football League since its inauguration in 2006 and lifted the trophy on three occasions. After winning the state league in the 2009–10 season, they qualified for the 2nd Division of the I-League, then top flight of Football in India.

NISA lifted prestigious Churachand Singh Invitation Trophy in 2007, defeating AMOFA Moirang, 2–0. They are also two time runners-up in the tournament during its 1969 and 1994 edition.

In the 2010 I-League 2nd Division, NISA started by winning four of six matches and secured a berth to the I-League qualification playoffs with 15 points. However, they failed to qualify for the 2010–11 I-League after a heartbreaking bottom finish without a single win.

2011 season
The team again participated in the I-League 2nd Division of the 2011 season. They were in group A with United Sikkim FC, Gauhati Town Club, Southern Samity, Langsning FC, Simla Youngs FC, and Golden Threads FC.

NISA opened the 2011 I-League 2nd Division with a 3–1 win over Golden Threads FC. NabaChnadra scored 2 goals and N Rakesh scored one. NISA beat Shimla Youngs 3–0. They finished their group A qualifying with 9 points and didn't qualify for final round. Their striker L. Nabachandra emerged as top scorer for the club with three goals.

The defending champion North Imphal Sporting Association Thangmeiband retained themselves as the champions in the prestigious Manipur State League in its sixth edition.

Later years
NISA again lifted Manipur State League title in 2013, defeating SSU Singjamei through penalty-shootout. The club also participated in Kohima Royal Gold Cup in Nagaland.

In 2019, NISA participated in Bodousa Cup in Assam and finished on third place. In that competition, they were given Fair Play Award.

Due to the COVID-19 pandemic in India pandemic, Manipur State League was cancelled in 2020 and again in April 2021, but came back in October, in which NISA was in Group B but failed to reach the knock-out stages.

Home grounds

Current venue
NISA Manipur is currently using Thangmeiband Athletic Union Ground (commonly known as THAU Ground) as their home stadium. Built in 2006, the ground is located in Thangmeiband, Imphal, and has a capacity of 5000 spectators.

Former venue
Khuman Lampak Main Stadium in Imphal, Manipur, was used as the home ground of NISA for their home matches in both the domestic and regional leagues. Opened in 1999, the stadium is owned by All Manipur Football Association and has a capacity of 35,285 spectators.

Rivalry
NISA has a strong rivalry with its fellow Manipuri clubs NEROCA FC and TRAU FC. This rivalry is visible highly during the Manipur State League every season. Until 2018, NISA has enjoyed the taste of these rivalries in the I-League 2nd Division.

Past internationals
The player(s) below had senior international cap(s) for their respective countries. Players whose name is listed, represented their countries before or after playing for NISA Manipur.
  Marcus Julien (2011–2013)

Honours

Domestic tournaments
League
 Manipur State League
Champions (5): 2007, 2008, 2009, 2011, 2013
Runners-up (1): 2012
Cup
 Churachand Singh Trophy
Champions (1): 2007
Runners-up (2): 1969, 1994
 Mayanglambam Chittamani Memorial Winners Cup
Runners-up (1): 2002

See also
 Football in India
 List of football clubs in Manipur
 Sports in Manipur

Notes

References

Further reading

External links

NISA Manipur at Soccerway
NISA Manipur at Betsapi
NISA Manipur at Scorebing
 NISA cancels trip as Jetlite cancel flight : 27th apr10 ~ E-Pao! Headlines

I-League clubs
Football clubs in Manipur
Association football clubs established in 2006
2006 establishments in Manipur
I-League 2nd Division clubs